The Albatros J.I was a German armored ground attack airplane of World War I, produced in 1918.

Design and development

The Albatros J.I was a "J-class" derivative of the Albatros C.XII reconnaissance aircraft.  The J.I utilized the wings and tail of the C.XII, which were joined to a new slab-sided fuselage. The crew compartment was protected by 490 kg (1,080 lb) of steel armor plate, while the engine was left unprotected. The sides and bottom were 5 mm thick chrome nickel steel plate that was bolted to the wood frame.

Power was provided by the 150 kW (200 hp) Benz Bz.IV, which gave marginal performance when combined with the heavy J.I airframe. The fixed 7.92 mm (.312 in) machine guns fired downward to facilitate strafing ground targets.

The Albatros J.I was developed for low-altitude battlefield reconnaissance and ground-attack missions, often at altitudes of 50 meters (150 feet) or less. Albatros J.Is were mainly issued to Flieger Abteilungen in support of the Army Corps or Army Headquarters.

German units began receiving the J.Is in April 1918 and they were first used in the Battle of the Lys. The aircraft was popular with crews, due to the armor protection and good visibility of the low set engine. Operationally a success, the main drawback of the type was the inadequate armor.

By June 1918, the new Albatros J.II started to replace J.I at the front. The older aircraft nevertheless served until the Armistice. Two were bought by Austria-Hungary. After the war, it was still operated by Poland, Norway, Ukraine. Poland was the largest post-war user of the type, operating 10 aircraft, which were captured during Greater Poland Uprising (1918–19). They were used during Polish-Soviet war, and four aircraft were lent by the Polish from September 1920 until February 1921 to an allied 1st Zaporizhska Aviation Escadrille of Ukrainian People's Army.

Operators

Luftstreitkräfte

Polish Air Force operated 10 aircraft postwar until 1921

Ukrainian People's Army operated 4 aircraft, lent by the Polish

Specifications (J.I)

See also

References

Bibliography
 Gray, Peter and Thetford, Owen (1962). German Aircraft of the First World War. London: Putnam. .

Biplanes
Single-engined tractor aircraft
1910s German attack aircraft
J.I
Aircraft first flown in 1917